Ernst Bernhard (1896-1965) was a German Jungian psychoanalyst, pediatrician and astrologer. Refused asylum by Britain in 1935, he lived in Rome, Italy from 1936 onwards. Following the fascist Italian racial laws of 1938,  Bernhard was sent to the internment camp, Ferramonti di Tarsia, in Calabria where he remained until the liberation of the camp by the Allies in September 1943.

Works
 Mitobiografia, 1969

References
2.    Pizzuti, Anna : Foreign Jews interned in Italy during the war   http://www.annapizzuti.it/database/ricerca.php?page=3

1896 births
1965 deaths
German psychoanalysts
German pediatricians
German astrologers
20th-century astrologers
Jungian psychologists
Jewish emigrants from Nazi Germany to Italy